This is a list of railway stations in Luxembourg.  Luxembourg has a well-developed railway network, due in part to its heavily-industrialised iron- and steel-producing Red Lands, which are particularly well served.  As a result, most towns with over a thousand inhabitants are served by at least one station (and, in the case of Luxembourg City, five).

B
 Bascharage-Sanem
 Belval-Rédange
 Belval-Université
 Belvaux-Soleuvre
 Berchem
 Bertrange-Strassen
 Bettembourg
 Betzdorf

C
 Capellen
 Cents-Hamm
 Cruchten
 Clervaux
 Colmar-Berg

D
 Diekirch
 Differdange
 Dippach-Reckange
 Dommeldange
 Drauffelt
 Dudelange-Burange
 Dudelange-Centre
 Dudelange-Usines
 Dudelange-Ville

E
 Esch-sur-Alzette
 Ettelbruck

G
 Goebelsmuhle

H
 Heisdorf
 Hollerich
 Howald

K
 Kautenbach
 Kayl
 Kleinbettingen

L
 Lamadelaine
 Leudelange
 Lintgen
 Lorentzweiler
 Luxembourg

M
 Mamer
 Mamer Lycée
 Manternach
 Maulusmuhle
 Merkholtz
 Mersch
 Mertert
 Michelau
 Munsbach

N
 Niederkorn
 Noertzange

O
 Oberkorn
 Oetrange

P
 Paradiso
 Pétange

R
 Rodange
 Roodt
 Rumelange

S
 Sandweiler-Contern
 Schieren
 Schifflange
 Schouweiler

T
 Tétange
 Troisvierges

W
 Walferdange
 Wasserbillig
 Wecker
 Wiltz
 Wilwerwiltz

External links

Railway stations
Luxembourg
Railway stations